Robert Anderson may refer to:

Arts and entertainment
Robert Anderson (editor and biographer) (1750–1830), Scottish literary scholar and editor
Robert Anderson (poet) (1770–1833), English poet
Robert Rowand Anderson (1834–1921), Scottish architect
Robert Anderson (silent film actor) (1890–1963), Danish-born American actor
Robert Alexander Anderson (composer) (1894–1995), American composer
Robert Anderson (filmmaker) (1913–1997), Canadian filmmaker
Robert Anderson (playwright) (1917–2009), American playwright and screenwriter
Robert Anderson (singer) (1919–1995), African-American gospel singer and composer
Bobby Anderson (actor) (1933–2008), American actor and television producer
Robert Theodore Anderson (1934–2009), American organist, composer, and pedagogue
Robert G. W. Anderson (born 1944), historian, former director of the British Museum
Robert Mailer Anderson (born 1968), American novelist

Law and politics
Robert Anderson (mayor) (fl. 1810s–1820s), mayor of Williamsburg, Virginia
Robert Stirling Hore Anderson (1821–1883), Irish-born Australian colonial politician
Robert M. Anderson (politician) (1824–1878), lieutenant governor of California
Robert H. Anderson (politician) (c. 1831–1879), American politician in New York
Sir Robert Anderson, 1st Baronet (1837–1921), Irish businessman and Lord Mayor of Belfast
Robert Anderson (Scotland Yard official) (1841–1918), lawyer, British intelligence officer and London CID chief, in charge during the Jack the Ripper murders
Robert Alexander Anderson (politician) (1858–1916), Canadian politician in British Columbia
Robert King Anderson (1861–1950), Canadian politician, physician and teacher
Rob Anderson (politician) (born 1977), Canadian politician in Alberta
Robert Newton Anderson (1871–1948), MP in the Northern Ireland Parliament for Londonderry
Robert P. Anderson (1906–1978), United States judge in Connecticut
Robert B. Anderson (1910–1989), businessman, politician, and U.S. Secretary of the Treasury
Robert B. Anderson (South Carolina politician), member of the South Carolina House of Representatives
Robert Banneka Anderson Sr., member of the South Carolina General Assembly
Robert Anderson (diplomat) (1922–1996), United States ambassador to Morocco
Robert A. Anderson (1932–2006), American politician and businessman
Robert Anderson (New Zealand politician) (1936–1996), New Zealand politician
Robert T. Anderson (born 1945), American politician, lieutenant governor of Iowa
Robert Anderson (Australian Aboriginal elder), Australian Aboriginal elder and union official

Military
Robert Anderson (Revolutionary War) (1741–1813), Revolutionary general and Lt. Governor of South Carolina
Robert Anderson (Civil War) (1805–1871), Union commander at Fort Sumter at the start of the American Civil War
Robert H. Anderson (1835–1888), Confederate officer (brigadier general) in the American Civil War
Robert Anderson (Medal of Honor) (1843–1900), U.S. Navy sailor and Medal of Honor recipient
Robert Anderson (Australian general) (1865–1940), Australian World War I brigadier general

Sports
Robert Anderson (MCC cricketer) (1811–1891), English cricketer, played for Hertfordshire 1835–36 and MCC 1837–41
Robert Anderson (American cricketer) (1893–?), American cricketer
Robert Anderson (New Zealand cricketer) (born 1948), New Zealand cricketer, played nine Tests and two One Day Internationals for New Zealand
Robert Anderson (rugby union) (c. 1900 – c. 1979), Australian rugby player
Robert Anderson (Australian rules footballer) (born 1959), Australian rules footballer
Robert Kiplagat Andersen (born 1972), Kenyan-born middle-distance runner who ran internationally for Denmark
Robbie Anderson (American football) (born 1993), American football wide receiver
Robbie Anderson (footballer) (1936–1996), English footballer

Other
Robert Anderson (mathematician) (fl. 1668–1696), English mathematician and silk-weaver
Robert Anderson (inventor) (fl. 1830s), Scottish inventor
Robert Anderson (Hollywood, Florida community leader) (1912–1998), banker and community leader in Hollywood, Florida
Robert Anderson (New Zealand philanthropist), New Zealand businessman and philanthropist (knighted 1934)
Robert Orville Anderson (1917–2007), American businessman and philanthropist
Robert Marshall Anderson (1933–2011), Episcopal bishop of Minnesota
Robert Charles Anderson (born 1944), American biochemist and genealogist
Robert Anderson (murderer) (1966–2006), American executed for killing a 5-year-old girl in Texas
Robert M. Anderson (mathematician) (born 1951), professor of economics and of mathematics
Robert Henry Anderson (1899–1969), Australian botanist
Robert Wherry Anderson (1864–1937), British journalist
Robert S. Anderson (born 1952), American geomorphologist
Robert J. Anderson (public health administrator) (1914–1999), director of the Centers for Disease Control and Prevention

See also
Bob Anderson (disambiguation)
Bobby Anderson (disambiguation)
Robert Andersson (disambiguation)
Joni Mitchell, born Roberta Anderson